Results from the 1982 Monaco Grand Prix Formula Three held at Monte Carlo on May 22, 1982, in the Circuit de Monaco.

Classification 

Monaco Grand Prix Formula Three